Pitcairn Island is the only inhabited island of the Pitcairn Islands, of which many inhabitants are descendants of mutineers of HMS Bounty.

Geography 

The island is of volcanic origin, with a rugged cliff coastline. Unlike many other South Pacific islands, it is not surrounded by coral reefs that protect the coast. The only access to the island is via a small pier on Bounty Bay. Adamstown is the sole settlement.

Pawala Valley Ridge is the island's highest point at 346 m above sea level.

The volcanic soil and tropical climate with abundant rainfall make the soil productive.

The average temperature ranges from 19 to 24°C. The annual rainfall is 1,800 mm.

As there are no rivers or lakes, drinking water is collected from the rain with cisterns.

Fauna 

Indigenous fauna consists of insects and lizards. Since their introduction, rats have become an invasive species.

A large number of seabirds nest along the steep shorelines.

Due to the absence of coral reefs, fishing is offshore. Sharks, sea bream, barracudas and tuna are all abundant. Whale migrations are seen yearly.

History and population

Gallery

References

External links 
 Pacific Union College History of Pitcairn Island

Islands of the Pitcairn Islands
Volcanic islands